József Vértesy (19 February 1901 – 21 December 1983) was a Hungarian water polo player who competed in the 1924 Summer Olympics,  in the 1928 Summer Olympics, and in the 1932 Summer Olympics. Born in Zombor, Austria-Hungary (today Sombor, Serbia) and died in Budapest, Hungary.

He first competed at the Olympics in 1924. As a member of the Hungarian water polo team he finished seventh. He played one match. Also he was part of the Hungarian water polo team which won the silver medal in 1928 and the gold medal 1932. In Amsterdam at the 1928 Summer Olympics he played all four matches and scored seven goals. Four years later in Los Angeles he played all three matches.

See also
 Hungary men's Olympic water polo team records and statistics
 List of Olympic champions in men's water polo
 List of Olympic medalists in water polo (men)

References

External links
 

1901 births
1983 deaths
Sportspeople from Sombor
Hungarians in Vojvodina
Hungarian male water polo players
Water polo players at the 1924 Summer Olympics
Water polo players at the 1928 Summer Olympics
Water polo players at the 1932 Summer Olympics
Olympic gold medalists for Hungary in water polo
Olympic silver medalists for Hungary in water polo
Medalists at the 1932 Summer Olympics
Medalists at the 1928 Summer Olympics
20th-century Hungarian people